The Bowe Brothers were a criminal family in New York City during the early-to-mid-19th century. The gang was headed by Martin Bowe, owner of the Catherine Slip sailors' home Glass House, and included Jack, Jim and Bill Bowe. All were well-known shooters, cutters and thieves in New York's Fourth Ward  and often led waterfront thugs in raids on dockyards and ships anchored in the East River. The brothers were also fences and disposed of money obtained by other waterfront gangs.

One of their men, Jack Madill, served as a bartender at the Glass House for over a year before his arrest for the murder of his wife. He had killed her in an argument when she refused to help him rob a drunken sailor and was sentenced to life imprisonment

References

Former gangs in New York City
Irish-American gangs
Irish-American culture in New York City
19th century in New York City